The Diocese of Arecibo is a Latin Church ecclesiastical territory or diocese of the Catholic Church and consists of half of the northern portion of the island of Puerto Rico, a commonwealth of the United States. The mother church is the Catedral de San Felipe Apostol located in City of Arecibo. Its jurisdiction includes the municipalities of Isabela, Quebradillas, Camuy, Hatillo, Arecibo, Barceloneta, Florida, Manatí, Vega Baja, Vega Alta, Lares, Utuado, Ciales, Morovis, Corozal, and Orocovis.

History

The See of Arecibo was canonically erected on 30 April 1960 and is a suffragan diocese in the ecclesiastical province of the metropolitan Archdiocese of San Juan de Puerto Rico.

Bishops
The list of ordinaries (bishops of the diocese) and their terms of service:
 Alfredo Méndez-Gonzalez, C.S.C. (1960–1974)
 Miguel Rodriguez Rodriguez, C.Ss.R. (1974–1990)
 Iñaki Mallona Txertudi, C.P. (1991–2010)
 Daniel Fernández Torres, (2010–2022)
 Alberto Arturo Figueroa Morales, (2022–)

Other priests of this diocese who became bishops
Enrique Manuel Hernández Rivera, appointed auxiliary bishop of San Juan in 1979
Alberto Arturo Figueroa Morales (priest here, 1990–1991), appointed auxiliary bishop of San Juan in 2019

San Juan Archdiocese bankruptcy
On 7 September 2018, Judge Edward Godoy ruled that the bankruptcy filed by the Archdiocese of San Juan would also apply to every Catholic diocese in Puerto Rico, including Arecibo, and that all would now have their assets protected under Chapter 11.

See also

 Arecibo, Puerto Rico
 Catholic Church by country
 Catholic Church in the United States
 Ecclesiastical Province of San Juan de Puerto Rico
 Global organisation of the Catholic Church
 List of Roman Catholic archdioceses (by country and continent)
 List of Roman Catholic dioceses (alphabetical) (including archdioceses)
 List of Roman Catholic dioceses (structured view) (including archdioceses)
 List of the Catholic dioceses of the United States

References

External links
 Diócesis de Arecibo (Official Site in Spanish)
 Roman Catholic Diocesis of Arecibo GCatholic.org website

1960 establishments in Puerto Rico
Arecibo
Christian organizations established in 1960
Arecibo
Arecibo